139th meridian may refer to:

139th  meridian east, a line of longitude east of the Greenwich Meridian
139th meridian west, a line of longitude west of the Greenwich Meridian